Slovenský Grob is a village and municipality in western Slovakia in  Pezinok District in the Bratislava region.

Slovenský Grob, in the foothills of the Small Carpathians, is geographically disposed to the rearing of geese. Its lakes, marshes and rich pastures – the result of a brook that formerly coursed through the village – are all factors in producing the ideal gosherding landscape.

Families would traditionally keep geese, then slaughter and consume them among themselves. But the economic hardships of the mid 20th century resulted in the goose meat making its way to markets in Bratislava and Pezinok, where it was a significant hit. Some intrepid gastronomes followed their stomachs to the source, and the housewives of Slovenský Grob became underground restaurateurs, transforming their living rooms into poultry-based speakeasys. After the Velvet Revolution, it didn't take a particularly glittering capitalist mind to spot a business opportunity, and lounges became dining rooms in less time than it took to pluck a bird.

References

External links

 Official page

Villages and municipalities in Pezinok District